David Carter (born 4 May 1945) is a former British diplomat who is an academic at Cambridge University.

Education
Carter was brought up in Zambia. He graduated from the University of Wales and subsequently earned a PhD in Social Sciences from Durham University, graduating in 1978. During his time in Durham he was a member of Hatfield College.

Diplomatic career
Carter joined Research Department of the Foreign and Commonwealth Office (FCO) in 1970. He was posted as Second Secretary to Accra in 1971, returning to the FCO in 1975. His next posting was as First Secretary and Head of Chancery to Manila in 1980. He returned to the FCO in 1983 and was appointed South Africa desk officer in Southern African Department. In 1986, he was posted to Lusaka as Deputy High Commissioner and Head of Chancery. He was in South Africa as Deputy Ambassador during the transition to democracy, and later served in India as Deputy High Commissioner. He was appointed High Commissioner to Bangladesh from 2000 to 2004.

Post retirement
In 2005, returning to academia, Carter went to Birmingham University as Deputy Director at the Centre for Studies in Security and Diplomacy, moving to Lucy Cavendish College, Cambridge as Bursar in July 2006. He is a member of the Royal Over-Seas League.

References

External links
 David Carter on Facebook

1945 births
Living people
Members of HM Diplomatic Service
High Commissioners of the United Kingdom to Bangladesh
Alumni of Hatfield College, Durham
Fellows of Lucy Cavendish College, Cambridge
20th-century British diplomats